Prochilodus is a genus of freshwater fish from the family Prochilodontidae. This family include two other genera, Ichthyoelephas and Semaprochilodus, which have been included in Prochilodus instead. The greatest species richness of Prochilodus is in river basins in eastern, southeastern and southern Brazil, but there are also species in the river basins of the Amazon, Guianas, Colombia, Venezuela, Paraguay and northeastern Argentina.

Species
FishBase recognize the following species in the genus:

 Prochilodus argenteus Spix & Agassiz, 1829 (Curimba) 
 Prochilodus brevis Steindachner, 1875 (Brazilian bocachico)
 Prochilodus britskii R. M. C. Castro, 1993
 Prochilodus costatus Valenciennes, 1850
 Prochilodus hartii Steindachner, 1875
 Prochilodus lacustris Steindachner, 1907
 Prochilodus lineatus (Valenciennes, 1837) (Streaked prochilos)
 Prochilodus magdalenae Steindachner, 1879
 Prochilodus mariae C. H. Eigenmann, 1922
 Prochilodus nigricans Spix & Agassiz, 1829 (Black prochilodus)
 Prochilodus reticulatus Valenciennes, 1850 (Netted prochilod)
 Prochilodus rubrotaeniatus Jardine, 1841
 Prochilodus vimboides Kner, 1859

References

External links

Prochilodontidae
Characiformes genera
Freshwater fish genera
Freshwater fish of South America
Taxa_named_by_Louis_Agassiz